Thomas John McAvoy (August 12, 1936 – March 19, 2011) was an American professional baseball pitcher. He was born in Brooklyn, New York.

Tom McAvoy was signed by the Senators in 1956 and played four seasons in the minor leagues before joining the big team on the final day of the 1959 season.

McAvoy was a player whose baseball career can be loosely described as a cup of coffee. He debuted against the Boston Red Sox on September 27, 1959, at Fenway Park as a replacement for starter Jim Kaat in the second inning, scattering one hit and two walks without strikeouts over 2⅔ shutout innings and did not have a decision. In that game, McAvoy retired Ted Williams on a grounder to second base. McAvoy never appeared in a major league game again.

In seven minor league seasons, McAvoy posted a 38–72 record and a 4.74 ERA in 176 pitching appearances.

McAvoy died in Stillwater, New York, at the age of 74, following complications from pancreatic cancer.

References

External links

1936 births
2011 deaths
Baseball players from New York (state)
Charlotte Hornets (baseball) players
Chattanooga Lookouts players
Deaths from cancer in New York (state)
Deaths from pancreatic cancer
Erie Senators players
Major League Baseball pitchers
Midland/Lamesa Indians players
Nashville Vols players
Raleigh Capitals players
Sportspeople from Brooklyn
Baseball players from New York City
Syracuse Chiefs players
Washington Senators (1901–1960) players
York White Roses players
Burials in Saratoga County, New York